Article Two may refer to:
 Article Two of the United States Constitution
 Article Two of the Constitution of Georgia (U.S. state)
 Article 2 of the European Convention on Human Rights
 Bill of Rights of Puerto Rico, Article Two of the Constitution of Puerto Rico